Myths, Legends and Other Amazing Adventures, Vol. 2 is a compilation album by American band The Aquabats, released on May 17, 2000 by Fearless Records. The album is a collection of studio outtakes, b-sides and miscellaneous unreleased tracks recorded during the production of the band's 1999 studio album, The Aquabats vs. the Floating Eye of Death!.

Overview
Following the release of their 1997 album The Fury of The Aquabats!, The Aquabats began writing scores of new material in preparation for their next studio album, producing upwards of forty different songs, partial songs and demo recordings. Approximately thirty of those songs received professional recordings during the sessions for what would become 1999's The Aquabats vs. the Floating Eye of Death!, with only fourteen ultimately selected to appear on the official album and the remaining tracks released on Myths & Legends. A large number of unfinished demos and unreleased b-sides were released for free on The Aquabats' website in April 2000 to coincide with the compilation's release.

Myths & Legends covers a broad range of musical styles, as The Aquabats had stated they wanted to explore more diverse musical textures after predominantly showcasing ska music on their first two albums. Much like Floating Eye, most of the tracks on Myths draw heavily upon punk rock and new wave-influenced sounds, with a pronounced usage of keyboards and synthesizers. The compilation also includes songs in synthpop ("Worms Make Dirt"), ska punk ("Pizza Day") and jazz ("Radiation Song") styles, as well as a parody of nu metal bands such as Korn and Limp Bizkit ("I Fell Asleep on My Arm").

As with Floating Eye, Myths & Legends represents the final Aquabats studio material to feature drummer Dr. Rock, lead guitarist The Mysterious Kyu and co-founding trumpeter Catboy, all of whom would part ways with The Aquabats prior to the recording of their next album.

Reception
Jeremy Salmon of Allmusic gave Myths & Legends two stars out of five, saying that "for all the weirdness, oddballity, and the delighted sense of stupid that one gets from the songs, one is disappointed by their uneven quality. Some of these tracks are relatively poor, but more are enjoyable in spite of themselves. If nothing else, this release shows that the Aquabats are as capable with track editing and song inclusion as they are with making their silly songs."

Track listing 
All songs written by The Aquabats.

Personnel

The Aquabats
 The MC Bat Commander – vocals
 Prince Adam - synthesizers, trumpet, theremin
 Jimmy the Robot – keyboards, woodwinds
 Crash McLarson – bass guitar
 Doctor Rock (Gabe Palmer) – drums
 Catboy – trumpet, vocals
 The Mysterious Kyu – guitar, banjo
 Chainsaw the Prince of Karate – guitar

Production
Produced by Cameron Webb and The Aquabats
"Adventure Today" recorded and produced by Thom Wilson

References

The Aquabats albums
B-side compilation albums
2000 compilation albums